This is a list of the Australian moth species of the family Tineidae. It also acts as an index to the species articles and forms part of the full List of moths of Australia.

Dryadaulinae
Dryadaula anthracorma Meyrick, 1915
Dryadaula brontoctypa (Meyrick, 1880)
Dryadaula epixantha (Turner, 1923)
Dryadaula glycinopa Meyrick, 1893
Dryadaula melanorma (Meyrick, 1893)
Dryadaula mesosticha (Turner, 1923)
Dryadaula napaea Meyrick, 1905
Dryadaula placens (Meyrick, 1920)
Dryadaula selenophanes (Meyrick, 1880)

Erechthiinae
Comodica cirrhopolia (Turner, 1923)
Comodica crypsicroca Turner, 1923
Comodica drepanosema Turner, 1923
Comodica tetracercella Meyrick, 1880
Comodica tigrina Turner, 1917
Erechthias acontistes Meyrick, 1880
Erechthias elaeorrhoa Meyrick, 1880
Erechthias eurynipha (Turner, 1923)
Erechthias acontotypa Turner, 1926
Erechthias aellophora Meyrick, 1880
Erechthias articulosa Meyrick, 1921
Erechthias trigonosema (Turner, 1923)
Erechthias beeblebroxi Robinson & Nielsen, 1993
Erechthias cyanosticta (Lower, 1916)
Erechthias orchestris (Turner, 1932)
Erechthias photophanes (Meyrick, 1917)
Erechthias deloneura (Turner, 1923)
Erechthias diacrita (Turner, 1923)
Erechthias diaphora (Meyrick, 1893)
Erechthias erebocosma (Meyrick, 1893)
Erechthias iseres (Turner, 1917)
Erechthias epomadia (Turner, 1923)
Erechthias acroleuca Turner, 1923
Erechthias citrinopa (Lower, 1905)
Erechthias epispora (Lower, 1905)
Erechthias iuloptera (Meyrick, 1880)
Erechthias minuscula (Walsingham, 1897)
Erechthias mystacinella (Walker, 1864)
Erechthias niphadopla Meyrick, 1880
Erechthias oxytona (Meyrick, 1893)
Erechthias celetica Turner, 1923
Erechthias polionota Turner, 1923
Erechthias polyplecta Turner, 1923
Erechthias centroscia (Turner, 1933)
Erechthias scythromorpha (Turner, 1926)
Erechthias sinapifera (Turner, 1926)
Erechthias simulans (Butler, 1882)
Erechthias ancistrosema Turner, 1939
Erechthias niphoplaca (Turner, 1923)
Erechthias oxymacha (Meyrick, 1893)
Erechthias phileris (Meyrick, 1893)
Erechthias symmacha (Meyrick, 1893)
Erechthias zebrina (Butler, 1881)
Tinea dicharacta Meyrick, 1893
Tinea leptocirrha Turner, 1926
Tinea muricata Meyrick, 1893
Tinea peristilpna Turner, 1926
Tinea pherauges Turner, 1923
Tinea sulfurata Turner, 1933

The following species belongs to the subfamily Erechthiinae, but has not been assigned to a genus yet. Given here is the original name given to the species when it was first described:
Comodica dochmogramma Lower, 1916
Erechthias euthydroma Meyrick, 1921
Decadarchis hyperacma Meyrick, 1915
Ereunetis streptogramma Lower, 1905

Hapsiferinae
Parochmastis dromaea (Turner, 1926)
Parochmastis styracodes Meyrick, 1917
Tiquadra atomarcha (Meyrick, 1917)
Trachycentra rhynchitis Meyrick, 1938

Hieroxestinae
Amphixystis antiloga (Meyrick, 1915)
Amphixystis hypolampes (Turner, 1923)
Asymplecta aplectodes (Turner, 1923)
Opogona asema (Turner, 1900)
Opogona basilissa (Turner, 1917)
Opogona calculata Meyrick, 1919
Opogona caryospila Meyrick, 1920
Opogona cataclasta Meyrick, 1915
Opogona chrysophanes Meyrick, 1915
Opogona citrolopha Meyrick, 1932
Opogona cleonyma (Meyrick, 1897)
Opogona comptella (Walker, 1864)
Opogona confinis Turner, 1926
Opogona conjurata (Meyrick, 1920)
Opogona crypsipyra Turner, 1923
Opogona fascigera Meyrick, 1915
Opogona fatima Meyrick, 1921
Opogona glycyphaga Meyrick, 1915
Opogona micranthes (Meyrick, 1897)
Opogona nebularis (Meyrick, 1897)
Opogona omoscopa (Meyrick, 1893)
Opogona orthotis (Meyrick, 1897)
Opogona papayae Turner, 1923
Opogona promalacta Meyrick, 1915
Opogona protodoxa (Meyrick, 1897)
Opogona sarophila Meyrick, 1915
Opogona scalena (Meyrick, 1897)
Opogona stenocraspeda (Meyrick, 1897)
Opogona stereodyta (Meyrick, 1897)
Opogona tetrasema (Turner, 1917)
Opogona tristicta (Meyrick, 1897)
Phaeoses caenologa (Meyrick, 1915)
Phaeoses flabilis (Turner, 1923)
Phaeoses leucoprosopa (Turner, 1923)

Meessiinae
Eudarcia anaglypta (Meyrick, 1893)
Eudarcia isoploca (Meyrick, 1919)
Oenoe eupasta (Turner, 1933)
Oenoe hemiphara (Meyrick, 1893)
Oenoe ocymorpha (Meyrick, 1893)
Tenaga nigripunctella (Haworth, 1828)
Xeringinia altilis (Meyrick, 1893)

Myrmecozelinae
Analytarcha colleta (Meyrick, 1893)
Analytarcha cyathodes Meyrick, 1921
Analytarcha ochroxantha (Turner, 1900)
Analytarcha trissoleuca (Turner, 1926)
Ectropoceros ecdela (Turner, 1926)
Ectropoceros optabilis (Meyrick, 1916)
Ectropoceros ostrina (Meyrick, 1916)
Ectropoceros pterocosma (Meyrick, 1916)
Gerontha acrosthenia Zagulyajev, 1972
Harmaclona entripta (Meyrick, 1917)
Mesopherna palustris Meyrick, 1893
Metapherna amaurodes (Meyrick, 1893)
Metapherna castella (Walker, 1863)
Metapherna isomacra (Meyrick, 1893)
Metapherna salsa (Meyrick, 1920)
Mimoscopa ochetaula Meyrick, 1893
Moerarchis australasiella (Donovan, 1805)
Moerarchis clathrata (R. Felder & Rogenhofer, 1875)
Moerarchis hypomacra (Turner, 1923)
Moerarchis inconcisella (Walker, 1863)
Moerarchis lapidea Turner, 1927
Moerarchis placomorpha Meyrick, 1922
Moerarchis pyrochroa (Meyrick, 1893)
Sarocrania ischnophylla Turner, 1923
Timaea bivittatella Walker, 1863

Nemapogoninae
Nemapogon granella (Linnaeus, 1758)
Vanna bisepta (Meyrick, 1893)

Perissomasticinae
Edosa abathra (Meyrick, 1920)
Edosa balanosema (Meyrick, 1893)
Edosa fraudulens (Rosenstock, 1885)
Edosa haplodora (Meyrick, 1917)
Edosa hemisema (Lower, 1903)
Edosa hypocritica (Meyrick, 1893)
Edosa idiochroa (Lower, 1918)
Edosa irruptella (Walker, 1864)
Edosa meliphanes (Meyrick, 1893)
Edosa ochracea (Meyrick, 1893)
Edosa ochranthes (Meyrick, 1893)
Edosa porphyrophaes (Turner, 1917)
Edosa purella (Walker, 1863)
Edosa talantias (Meyrick, 1893)
Edosa tyrannica (Meyrick, 1893)
Edosa xystidophora (Meyrick, 1893)

Scardiinae
Morophaga clonodes (Meyrick, 1893)
Tinissa cinerascens Meyrick, 1910
Tinissa rigida Meyrick, 1910

Setomorphinae
Lindera tessellatella Blanchard, 1852
Setomorpha rutella Zeller, 1852

Tineinae
Acridotarsa celsella (Walker, 1863)
Acridotarsa conglomerata (Meyrick, 1922)
Acridotarsa mylitis Meyrick, 1893
Craniosara pyrotricha (Meyrick, 1893)
Crypsithyris illaetabilis Turner, 1926
Crypsithyrodes concolorella (Walker, 1863)
Hippiochaetes chrysaspis Meyrick, 1880
Monopis argillacea (Meyrick, 1893)
Monopis chrysogramma (Lower, 1899)
Monopis cirrhospila Turner, 1923
Monopis crocicapitella (Clemens, 1859)
Monopis ethelella (Newman, 1856)
Monopis icterogastra (Zeller, 1852)
Monopis meliorella (Walker, 1863)
Monopis monacha Zagulajev, 1972
Monopis ochroptila Turner, 1923
Monopis pentadisca Meyrick, 1924
Monopis stichomela (Lower, 1900)
Monopis trigonoleuca Turner, 1917
Niditinea fuscella (Linnaeus, 1758)
Phereoeca praecox Gozmány & Vári, 1973
Praeacedes atomosella (Walker, 1863)
Thomintarra primaeva (Meyrick, 1893)
Tinea chaotica Meyrick, 1893
Tinea columbariella Wocke, 1877
Tinea corynephora Turner, 1927
Tinea drymonoma Turner, 1923
Tinea dubiella Stainton, 1859
Tinea flavescentella Haworth, 1828
Tinea melanoptycha (Turner, 1939)
Tinea murariella Staudinger, 1859
Tinea pallescentella Stainton, 1851
Tinea pellionella Linnaeus, 1758
Tinea porphyrota Meyrick, 1893
Tinea translucens Meyrick, 1917
Tinea tridectis Meyrick, 1893
Tineola bisselliella (Hummel, 1823)
Trichophaga tapetzella (Linnaeus, 1758)

External links 
Tineidae at Australian Faunal Directory
Tineidae at lepidoptera.butterflyhouse

Australia